Ted Nelson is an American pioneer of information technology, sociologist, and philosopher.

Ted Nelson may also refer to:

Ted Nelson (coach) (born c. 1942), American track and field coach 
Teddy Nelson (Terje Nielsen, 1939–1992), Norwegian country music artist

See also
Edward Nelson (disambiguation)